Aleksei Bobrov may refer to:

 Aleksei Bobrov (footballer, born 1972), Russian football player
 Aleksei Bobrov (footballer, born 1973), Russian football player